Anonychomyrma polita is a species of ant in the genus Anonychomyrma. Described by Stitz in 1912, the species is endemic to Indonesia.

References

Anonychomyrma
Insects of Indonesia
Insects described in 1912